The Day of Restoration of Independence (Azerbaijani: Azərbaycanda Müstəqilliyin Bərpası Günü) is a state holiday in Azerbaijan. It is celebrated annually on October 18. On this day in 1991, the Supreme Soviet of Azerbaijan adopted a Constitutional Act on the Declaration of Independence of Azerbaijan. The declaration was confirmed by a referendum in December 1991.

Until 2021, it was marked as Independence Day. In October 2021, it was renamed and became Day of Restoration of Independence.

Celebrations
The fifth anniversary celebrations of 1996 were the first major celebrations of the holiday. Large scale celebrations also took place on the 10th anniversary in 2001. In 2017, a military parade was held through the capital of the Nakhchivan Autonomous Republic in honor of the 25th anniversary of the establishment of the first military unit and 26th anniversary of the restoration of independence. The event was attended by the President of Nakhchivan Vasif Talibov and Azerbaijani Defense Minister Zakir Hasanov.

Connected commemorations with Independence Day 
The second parade of independent Azerbaijan was held on Azadliq Square on October 9, 1992 in commemoration of the first anniversary of the establishment of the Azerbaijani Armed Forces, and was held also in connection with the anniversary of the restoration of independence. In 1998, the inauguration of Heydar Aliyev coincided with the celebration of Independence Day. A year later, in 1999, the celebrations of the 75th anniversary of the Nakhchivan Autonomous Republic were connected with the Independence Day holiday just 6 days later.

Foreign commemorations 
In 2020, Canada's Niagara Falls were lit up in colours of Azerbaijani flag to mark Independence Day. That same year, a Turkish delegation led by Speaker of the Grand National Assembly of Turkey Mustafa Sentop visited Baku to participate in the celebrations, in a show of support for Azerbaijan after the Ganja ballistic missile attacks.

Gallery

See also 
Republic Day (Azerbaijan)
Public holidays in Azerbaijan

References 

October observances
Azerbaijan
1991 establishments in Azerbaijan
Public holidays in Azerbaijan
Autumn events in Azerbaijan